Franz Sedlacek (21 January 1891 – 1945) was an Austrian painter who belonged to the tradition known as "New Objectivity" ("neue Sachlichkeit"), an artistic movement similar to Magical Realism. At the end of the Second World War he "disappeared" as a soldier of the Wehrmacht near Toruń, Poland. He was declared missing on February 1, 1945 and pronounced dead in 1972.

Biography 
Franz Sedlacek was born in Breslau on 21 January 1891, and moved with his family to Linz in 1897. In 1909 he graduated from the Royal High School at the Fadingerstraße. A year later, he moved to Vienna and studied architecture and chemistry.

In 1923, Sedlacek married Maria Albrecht.  The couple raised two daughters.

Sedlacek joined the Wehrmacht in 1939, fighting in Russia, Norway and Poland. He went missing during the battle for the Toruń Fortress.

Work

In 1913, Sedlacek founded an artistic association in Linz with Anton Lutz, Klemens Brosch, Franz Bitzan, and Heinz Bitzan. Sedlacek began as a graphic artist, and later turned to oil painting.

In 1925 he produced a number of watercolours for Claire Annabel Caroline Grant Duff's Book The Unicorn.

In 1927, Sedlacek joined the Viennese Secession, an association of artists that was founded by Gustav Klimt and others in 1897.

In 1930, Sedlacek's work was included in an exhibition of Austrian art at the Museum of Modern Art in New York. He was subsequently awarded the Austrian State Prize for painting thrice: in 1933, 1935 and 1937.

A collection of his works is on exhibition at the Leopold Museum in the Museumsquartier in Vienna, Austria, including the 1931 painting, "Lied in der Dämmerung" ("Song in the Twilight"), as well as in the Albertina Museum. Also  "Sturm" (Storm) 1932 in the Belvedere Museum Vienna.

References

External links

 Entry with the Aeiou Encyclopedia
 Biography, Literature and Works by Franz Sedlacek

1891 births
1945 deaths
20th-century Austrian painters
Austrian male painters
Austrian people of Czech descent
Artists from Wrocław
People from the Province of Silesia
Austro-Hungarian military personnel of World War I
German Army personnel killed in World War II
Missing in action of World War II
German Army officers of World War II
20th-century Austrian male artists